Owl Creek is a stream in Warren County in the U.S. state of Missouri. It is a tributary of North Fork Charrette Creek.

Owl Creek most likely was named after the animal.

See also
List of rivers of Missouri

References

Rivers of Warren County, Missouri
Rivers of Missouri